(KOF XI) is a 2D fighting game produced by SNK Playmore. It is the eleventh installment in The King of Fighters series following The King of Fighters 2003. It was originally released as a coin-operated arcade game for the Atomiswave platform in 2005. A home version for the PlayStation 2 was released in Japan in 2006, followed by releases in the PAL region and North America in 2007. It is the first The King of Fighters game to not run on the Neo Geo and also the first one to not be named after its year of release.

Set after the events of The King of Fighters 2003, the story focuses on a group known as "Those from the Past", who aim to obtain the power of the ancient demon Orochi. The player can choose from a total of forty characters, including characters from other SNK games; in the PlayStation 2 port, this includes characters from the crossover game NeoGeo Battle Coliseum. The game retains many elements from its predecessor, involving fights between six fighters who can tag during the battle. It also provides new features allowing the player to perform simultaneous multiple special moves.

Critical reception to The King of Fighters XI has been positive. Critics enjoyed the new fighting system, the balance between characters, as well as other elements that managed to improve upon its predecessor. However, the graphics were found to be dated due to the use of 2D pixel graphics. Also, a few journalists found the final bosses too complicated to defeat. Despite skeptical commercial expectations for the game, as it was being released on the PlayStation 2 when that console was being abandoned, it was still noted to sell well in Japan, and was followed by a sequel titled The King of Fighters XII, released in 2009.

Gameplay

The game retains the gameplay elements from The King of Fighters 2003 involving fights between six characters who can tag between members during battle. It also provides new features which allow the player to perform simultaneous multiple special moves. The four most substantial innovations The King of Fighters XI brings to the franchise are Quick Shift, Saving Shift, the Skill Bar and Dream Cancels. The Power Stocks that existed before are still present, and are filled through encounters within fighters. There are now Skill Stocks which gradually build up over time. Each team begins a match holding the maximum of two Skill Stocks. Offensive maneuvers, such as Desperation Moves, Guard Cancels, and Tag Attacks, continue to use Power Stocks; however, more defensive or tactical maneuvers, such as Guard Evasion, Saving Shift, and Quick Shift, use Skill Stocks.

The King of Fighters XI utilizes the Tactical Shift System from The King of Fighters 2003. The Quick Shift allows the player to change into another character in the middle of any combo, prolonging it, or in the middle of any attack, canceling the attack's animation frames if needed. The Saving Shift allows the player to take out a character when they are being hit, or as soon as they are hit, at the cost of both skill bars. The last new feature of The King of Fighters XI is the Dream Cancel. Like the Super Cancel that first appeared in The King of Fighters '99, Dream Cancel allows players to use stocks to interrupt a move in the midst of its execution, with a more powerful move, allowing for devastating combos.

Should the timer run down during a match, the winner is no longer decided based on remaining life; instead, the judgment bar, a new circular bar composed of two colors, each one representing a player, quantifies each player's skill. If none of the two teams manages to win by defeating all three characters from the opposite team, the placement of the judgement bar decides who the victor is. The judgment bar is affected by each attack in which the players are involved. Combos affect the bar more, and when a character of the opposing team is defeated, the bar changes significantly against that player. On the rare occasion when the bar is exactly in the center, the match will end in a draw and both sides will lose.

The PlayStation 2 port added multiple modes not present in the arcade version. The player can use the original The King of Fighters team mode where characters are not randomly tagged and instead fight in an order decided by the player. In Challenge Mode, the player is given multiple missions where they can unlock a total of seven characters from NeoGeo Battle Coliseum. There is also an Edit Mode, where the player can alter the appearance of each character and give them different colors such as making Kyo Kusanagi shoot green flames instead of red.

Plot

During the events of The King of Fighters 2003, Mukai, a member of a mysterious group known as "Those from the Distant Land", stole the seal belonging to the demon Orochi. Taking advantage of this situation, Ash Crimson attacked Chizuru Kagura in her weakened state and stole the Yata Mirror from her, draining her powers in the process. In due time, a new tournament is established which follows the previous tournament's new rules, with both established fighters and newcomers participating in the competition. The hosts of the tournament are two members of "Those from the Distant Land", consisting of a weapons expert named Shion and a dimension manipulator named Magaki, who serve as the respective sub and final bosses of the game. Following their defeat, Magaki tries to escape and steal Orochi's power, but instead ends up being murdered by his own ally Shion. In the ensuing chaos, Ash attacks a rampaging Iori Yagami (affected by his Riot of the Blood curse) who had seriously injured both Kyo Kusanagi and Shingo Yabuki, managing to steal the Yasakani Jewel from him. Despite being confronted by his estranged childhood friend Elisabeth Blanctorche and her two associates Benimaru Nikaido and Duo Lon, Ash manages to swiftly escape from them, warning the trio that he intends to target Kyo as his final victim in the near future.

Characters
The main cast includes the following 40 characters:

Ash Team (Hero Team)
Ash Crimson
Oswald
Shen Woo
Elisabeth Team (Rivals Team)
Elisabeth Blanctorche
Duo Lon
Benimaru Nikaido
Fatal Fury Team
Terry Bogard
Kim Kaphwan
Duck King
Art of Fighting Team
Ryo Sakazaki
Yuri Sakazaki
King

Ikari Warriors Team
Ralf Jones
Clark Still
Whip
Psycho Soldier Team
Athena Asamiya
Sie Kensou
Momoko
Garou Team
B. Jenet
Gato
Tizoc 
Agents Team
Vanessa
Blue Mary
Ramón

Anti-Kyokugenryu Team
Eiji Kisaragi
Kasumi Todoh
Malin
K' Team
K'
Kula Diamond
Maxima
Kusanagi-Yagami Team
Kyo Kusanagi
Iori Yagami
Shingo Yabuki

Mid-bosses
Adelheid Bernstein
Gai Tendo
Sho Hayate
Silber
Jyazu
Sub-boss
Shion
Final boss
Magaki
PlayStation 2 exclusive
Hotaru Futaba
Mai Shiranui
Robert Garcia
Tung Fu Rue
EX Kyo Kusanagi
Mr. Big
Geese Howard

Development and release
In December 2004, Falcoon, the series' main illustrator, said the next game SNK Playmore were developing would be different from the recent spin-off The King of Fighters: Maximum Impact, which was originally intended to be released as The King of Fighters 2004. Development of the game began when SNK completed production on the crossover game NeoGeo Battle Coliseum in 2005. SNK cancelled production of The King of Fighters 2004 in the fall of 2004, after it was announced the company had signed an agreement with Sammy Corporation to use their arcade system instead of the Neo Geo cabinets that had been used for the franchise previously. The King of Fighters XI arcade version used Sammy Corporation's Atomiswave system. SNK commented that by using this new system, The King of Fighters XI would stand out from its predecessors due to improvements in both gameplay mechanics and graphic quality, specifically the animation frames created for Iori Yagami. However, it lacked the AW-net, a program that allows for online play. SNK had previously tested this system for both NeoGeo Battle Coliseum and The King of Fighters Neowave.

Hiroaki Hashimoto was the main designer for all of the game's characters, while Nona illustrated the endings. When the arcade version was released in the US, cabinets in Tilt Studio locations used converted Final Furlong cabinets, instead of the standard Atomiswave cabinets. As a result of this, there were two screens, one for each player. The addition of mid-bosses from Buriki One and Kizuna Encounter were meant to surprise gamers; since their original moves did not "fit" in The King of Fighters XI, developers had to change some of them. In 1999, SNK released a Fatal Fury installment named Garou: Mark of the Wolves whose narrative lacked closure. As a result, the company decided to utilize those characters in The King of Fighters XI with a bigger role. The movements of the boss character Magaki – the leader of the group of antagonists "Those from the Past" – were intentionally designed to "disgust and disturb fans". The staff had mixed opinions about newcomer Momoko due to her relatively young age. She was designed to fit the Psycho Soldier Team. Meanwhile, Elisabeth was created as a "leading lady" character to give Ash Crimson a rival. Developers sought to make the levels as realistic as possible, with particular focus paid to the Esaka stage. The company planned to add more stages, but these were removed due to time constraints.

The game's Japanese port for the PlayStation 2 was released on June 22, 2006. Multiple changes were made for the port to make the controls more responsive, based on feedback from the arcade. On September 8, 2006, Ignition Entertainment announced they had licensed The King of Fighters XI for a European release. SNK Playmore USA announced the game on November 13, 2007. With respect to the progressive scan, SNK explained that the North American version of the game was based on the PAL region. As a result, the American and PAL versions do not support progressive scan, but the Japanese version does. The port was mostly done by Ignition and then reused in other regions, although SNK remained silent about this. Similar to previous entries, the port offers a rearranged version of the audio. SNK Playmore re-released the game in Japan on June 28, 2007, under the label of "SNK Best Collection". The company once again released the game for the PlayStation Network on December 17, 2014, in Japan. In 2020, a homebrew conversion was released for the Dreamcast.

On March 24, 2006, Scitron and SNK released , a soundtrack from the game. It consists of two CDs, each containing different versions of the same 37 tracks. While some tracks are identical to the ones from the game, others have been rearranged. Disc one has the tracks from the arcade version, while disc two has the tracks from the PS2 version. The music was composed by SHA-V and arranged by Koji Takata, Masuo Okumura and Masanori Kuki.

Reception

Since the PlayStation 2 was being replaced by a new console during the release of The King of Fighters XI, Gamasutra listed the game as one for the "hardcore gamer". However, in its release week in Japan, The King of Fighters XI was the only PlayStation 2 title to be featured on Japanese sales charts alongside Konami's World Soccer Winning Eleven 10. The number of copies the game sold in Japan throughout 2005 is unknown, although it sold 47,225 units in 2006.

Critical reception to The King of Fighters XI has been "generally favorable" based on an average score of 75 out of 100 on the Metacritic website. The quality of gameplay and cast of characters was the subject of positive response. GameZone said it offered the "most bang for your buck" on the PS2, considering its late release schedule, calling it a "complex" 2D fighter game. A reviewer for Cheat Code Central said they enjoyed the game mode in which the player controlled three characters fighting against another trio during a single fight, and cited the new mechanics as an improvement over those of its predecessor The King of Fighters 2003. GamesRadar+ enjoyed the considerably higher number of characters and the noticeably fast combat than in previous entries in the series. Ryan Clements of IGN called it "a very old-school 2D fighter" while indicating that the style of the series had not changed much since The King of Fighters '94. He said the game was well organized, despite the large number of playable characters, and enjoyed experimenting with each character's variable fighting techniques. He added that fights would be very difficult for players, until they learned how to use the special moves. Andrew Park of GameSpot opined that the game was well-balanced with its variety of playable characters and complimented its illustrative design. Eurogamer called it an "excellent 2D game", comparable to other works such as one of Capcom's most famous games, Street Fighter III, although they complained about the lack of popular characters from the franchise such as Joe Higashi.

Numerous publications said the graphics were dated due to SNK Playmore's constant use of sprites, although Siliconera enjoyed the art employed in other areas of the game which they said showed a significant increase in graphic quality. Eurogamer said The King of Fighters XI would not stand out amongst other fighting game franchises like Soul Calibur or Tekken, which employ 3D graphics in contrast with this game's 2D graphics. Meristation agreed, saying the franchise was in need of a major overhaul. IGN said the developers should have optimized the graphics, though they felt the menus and cutscenes were well done. uVeJuegos.com was more critical, saying that SNK Playmore should have updated the graphics of the series several years earlier. On the other hand, Game Revolution did not mind the use of 2D graphics based on how the scenarios change across the fights. Despite finding the game's graphics dated, GameZone enjoyed the overall presentation, which the reviewer called "one of best fighting games ever to grace the PS2", noting its low price provided great replay value.

The boss characters attracted some negative responses. GameSpot described the sub-boss Shion as "terribly powerful" and the final boss Magaki as "absurdly overpowered", and criticized the voice acting for the Magaki character, additionally noting that his appearance was unimpressive. GamesRadar+ agreed, describing Magaki as a "Typical KoF final boss from hell". While noting the artificial intelligence had improved from that used in The King of Fighters 2003, uVeJuegos.com said Magaki had unfair moves due to his massive damage input during battles. Game Revolutions reviewer felt that Magaki was one of the strongest bosses they had ever seen based on the way he moves across the screen. He said that proper use of the game's mechanics would allow the player to defeat him and said that the game was still enjoyable despite this boss.

In a retrospective review, HardcoreGaming regarded The King of Fighters XI as one of the best entries in the franchise, noting the backgrounds' quality, the gameplay and quick load times compared to the original arcade game. In 2012, Complex ranked it as the eighth best SNK fighting game ever made, adding that "Shion has to be the coolest sub-boss ever". In 2009, SNK Playmore released a sequel called The King of Fighters XII. However, as the game did not feature a story, SNK Playmore finished the story arc involving Ash in The King of Fighters XIII released in 2011.

Notes

References

External links
 The King of Fighters XI at the official Japanese website of SNK Playmore

2005 video games
2D fighting games
Arcade video games
Fighting games used at the Super Battle Opera tournament
PlayStation 2 games
PlayStation Network games
Sega arcade games
SNK Playmore games
The King of Fighters games
Fighting games
Tag team videogames
Video games developed in Japan
Video games set in Japan
Video games set in the United States
Video games set in Russia
Video games set in South America
Video games set in Italy
Video games set in Spain
Video games set in Cambodia
UTV Ignition Games games
Multiplayer and single-player video games